Hedychium is a genus of flowering plants in the ginger family Zingiberaceae, native to lightly wooded habitats in Asia. There are approximately 70-80 known species, native to India, Southeast Asia, and Madagascar. Some species have become widely naturalized in other lands, and considered invasive in some places.

The genus name Hedychium is derived from two ancient Greek words,  meaning "sweet" and  meaning "snow". This refers to the fragrant white flower of the type species H. coronarium. Common names include garland flower, ginger lily, and kahili ginger.

Some species are cultivated for their exotic foliage and fragrant spikes of flowers in shades of white, yellow and orange. Numerous cultivars have been developed for garden use, of which 'Tara' has gained the Royal Horticultural Society's Award of Garden Merit.

Selected species

Hedychium aureum C.B.Clarke & G.Mann ex Baker
Hedychium chingmeianum N.Odyuo & D.K.Roy
Hedychium chrysoleucum Hook. - gold spot ginger lily
Hedychium coccineum Buch.-Ham. ex Sm. 
Hedychium coronarium J.Koenig
Hedychium deceptum N.E.Br. (synonym - H. rubrum)
Hedychium densiflorum 
Hedychium elatum R.Br. ex Ker Gawl.
Hedychium ellipticum Buch.-Ham. ex Sm. - shaving brush ginger
Hedychium flavum Roxb. 
Hedychium flavescens Carey ex Roscoe
Hedychium forrestii Diels (synonym - H. dekianum A.S.Rao & D.M.Verma 
Hedychium gardnerianum Sheppard ex Ker Gawl.
Hedychium gomezianum Wall.
Hedychium gracile Roxb. - Salmon ginger lily
Hedychium greenii W.W.Sm.
Hedychium griersonianum R.M.Sm.
Hedychium griffithianum Wall. 
Hedychium larsenii Dan & C.S.Kumar
Hedychium longipedunculatum A.R.K.Sastry & D.M.Verma
Hedychium marginatum C.B.Clarke
Hedychium nagamiense Sanoj, M.Sabu & V.P.Thomas
Hedychium raoii
Hedychium samuiense
Hedychium spicatum Sm.- called kapur kachari in Hindi
Hedychium stenopetalum Lodd.
Hedychium thyrsiforme 
Hedychium urophyllum Lodd.
Hedychium villosum Wall.
Hedychium wardii C.E.C. Fisch. (synonym - H. efilamentosum Hand.-Mazz.)  
Hedychium ziroense V.Gowda & Ashokan

Taxonomy and phylogeny 
In 2000, Tom Wood et al. published the first phylogeny of the genus Hedychium represented by 29 taxa.

Reproductive biology 
Hedychium has multiple modes of reproduction: sexual, via rhizomes and via bulbils. Some species of Hedychium are reported to exhibit facultative vivipary.

See also

 List of plants known as lily

References

External links

 http://www.usna.usda.gov/Gardens/faqs/Subtropicals.html 

 
Zingiberaceae genera